Castel del Giudice is a comune (municipality) in the Province of Isernia in the Italian region of Molise, located about  northwest of Campobasso and about  north of Isernia.

Castel del Giudice borders the following municipalities: Ateleta, Capracotta, Gamberale, San Pietro Avellana, Sant'Angelo del Pesco.

References

Cities and towns in Molise